St. Michan's Catholic Church  is a Catholic Church located on the Northside of Dublin, Ireland. It is the parish church for the Halston Street Parish in the Archdiocese of Dublin.

History
The church was built between 1810 and 1817. It was constructed before Catholic Emancipation (1829) and wasn't allowed an entrance that opened onto a main street. The presence of Green Street Courthouse and Newgate Prison had elevated the importance of Halston Street at the time and so entry to the church was through the less important North Anne Street to the west. In the late nineteenth century, the addition of a tall castellated tower by George Ashlin to the east provided a new entrance from Halston Street. The church contains a number of impressive stained-glass windows by German stained-glass designers and manufacturers, Mayer & Company of Munich as well as a window attributed to Harry Clarke in the Mortuary Chapel.

People Associated with St. Michan's
 Fr. Bryan Shortall OFM Cap., Parish Priest 2010–present.
 Bishop John Dempsey, served in St Michan's, before becoming Bishop of Kildare
 Archbishop Patrick Fitzsimons STD served as parish priest at St. Michan's from 1744 to 1763, prior to becoming Archbishop of Dublin
 Archbishop John Linegar, served as a curate in St. Michan's, serving from 1697 to 1707, from nearby Broadstone, he is buried in the church graveyard.
 Rev. Dr. Cornelius Nary DCL, LLD, catholic writer, controversialist, and activist, served as parish priest

References

External links
 
 
 
 
 

Churches of the Roman Catholic Archdiocese of Dublin
Roman Catholic churches in Dublin (city)
19th-century Roman Catholic church buildings in Ireland
19th-century churches in the Republic of Ireland